KNOB is a commercial radio station in Healdsburg, California, broadcasting to the Santa Rosa, California, area on 96.7 FM. The station airs an adult hits format and is branded as "Bob FM".

History
KNOB previously aired an alternative rock format branded as "96X". 96X announced on April 9, 2017, that they no longer have a lease with KNOB.

On October 4, 2018, KNOB returned to the air with variety hits, branded as "96.7 Bob FM".

References

External links

Healdsburg, California
Mass media in Sonoma County, California
NOB
Adult hits radio stations in the United States
Radio stations established in 2002
2002 establishments in California